United Heavy Machinery or  Uralmash-Izhora Group, (OMZ) is a large Russia-based international heavy industry and manufacturing conglomerate. OMZ manufactures a wide range of steel, custom and industrial components for nuclear power plants, petrochemical and mining operations and utilities. In particular OMZ is a manufacturer of reactor pressure vessels for the VVER type of nuclear reactors and the manufacturer of EKG open-cut mining power shovels.

As a Russian open joint-stock company, shares in OMZ may be publicly traded subject to terms of constitutive documents and merger agreements.

OMZ was formed in 1996 in the incorporation of Ural Machine-Building Plants with ZSMK. Izhora Plants merged with OMZ in 1999 and the company was renamed OMZ (Uralmash-Izhora Group). In 2003 the company combined with Pilsen Steel and Škoda JS, the former steel and nuclear subsidiaries of Škoda Works. In 2008 CHETENG Engineering also joined. OMZ is a 50% owner of the Uralmash Machine-Building Corporation formed in a 2007 agreement with Metalloinvest.

The company's shares were delisted from the Moscow and London stock exchanges in 2014 "due to the economic inexpedience of supporting the insignificant free-float of less than 0.33% of the capital."

See also 
Uralmash
Izhorsky Zavod
Kakha Bendukidze
Gazprombank

External links
OMZ company website
Financial information
Skoda JS
Pilsen Steel
CHETENG s.r.o
Uralmash Machine-Building Joint Venture

References

Manufacturing companies of Russia
Engineering companies of Russia
Nuclear technology companies of Russia
Manufacturing companies established in 1996
Companies listed on the Moscow Exchange
Multinational companies headquartered in Russia
Conglomerate companies of Russia
 
Industrial machine manufacturers
Manufacturing companies based in Moscow